Freda Diesing School of Northwest Coast Art is a progressive art school focusing on the "Northern Style" of the Northwest Coast Art.  The school is located on the Coast Mountain College Campus in Terrace, BC; Canada.  This school is unique because it is a university credit program, recognized by Emily Carr University, that focuses on First Nations art and culture in a context where the culture and people who originated it live today.

Named after the Haida artist and carver Freda Diesing, the school was started in the Fall of 2006 by one of Freda's students, Dempsey Bob, and two of his nephews, Ken McNeil and Stan Bevan.

Although there are various courses in the school curriculum, the school focuses on carving in the Northern Style, with drawing, painting, art history and toolmaking courses supporting the carving component of the school.

The school frequently invites guest speakers for presentations to the class.  These speakers include Robert Davidson, Roy Henry Vickers, Keith Smartch, Bill McLennan, Greg Schauff, and representatives from the Royal BC Museum, the Canadian Museum of Civilization and other institutions representing the arts and culture in the Northwest Coast.

The school can accept about 20 students in an academic year and, as of September 2010, the school has had 31 graduates.

References

External links 
 Freda Diesing School of Northwest Coast Art Website

Emily Carr University of Art and Design